PX or px may refer to:

In business
 PX Index, index of the Prague Stock Exchange
 Air Niugini (IATA airline code PX)
 Part exchange, a type of contract
 Post exchange, a store operated by the Army and Air Force Exchange Service on US Army posts
 Praxair (stock symbol PX)
 Power exchange, the entity that operates an electricity market through which electricity is traded
 Phone Number
 People Experience, the rebranding of Human Resources (HR), reflecting a focus on putting people and their experiences first

Medicine
 Medical prescription (a misprint of Rx)
 Medical procedure, a Prognosis or Physical Exam
 Patient experience

Chemistry
 p-Xylene (Paraxylene), an aromatic hydrocarbon, based on benzene with two methyl substituents, of which PX is the industrial symbol.
 Peroxidase
 Pyroxenes, commonly abbreviated to Px, are a group of important rock-forming inosilicate minerals
 Protein crystallography, the study of protein crystals to determine the molecular structure of proteins

Other uses
 Pixel, in digital displays
 PX clade, a taxonomic group of stramenopiles algae that includes Phaeophyceae and Xanthophyceae
 Operation PX, a planned Japanese biological attack on the United States in World War II
 Pedro Ximénez, a grape used in the making of sweet sherries and wines from Montilla-Moriles

See also

 
 
 
 PXS (disambiguation)
 XP (disambiguation)
 X (disambiguation)
 P (disambiguation)